Integrated Motor Assist (commonly abbreviated as IMA) is Honda's hybrid car technology, introduced in 1999 on the Insight. It is a specific implementation of a parallel hybrid.  It uses an electric motor mounted between the internal combustion engine and transmission to act as a starter motor, engine balancer, and assist traction motor.

Overview
In its first generation, IMA could not power the car on electricity alone, and could only use the motor to assist or start the engine.  2006 Civic Hybrid, however, can activate the electric motor while the vehicle is coasting without turning on the internal combustion engine, though in contrast to Toyota's Hybrid Synergy Drive (HSD) or General Motors and DaimlerChrysler's Global Hybrid Cooperation, the IMA has a less powerful motor/generator which allows the car to slow or stop its rate of deceleration to a lesser extent; it cannot operate without turning over the engine which is directly coupled to its electric motor.

Regenerative braking
The IMA uses regenerative braking to capture some of the energy that would otherwise be lost as heat during braking and reuse that energy later to help accelerate the vehicle. This has three effects: it increases the rate of acceleration, reduces the work required of the engine, and reduces the frequency of brake hardware replacement. The acceleration boost is important as it allows the engine to be scaled down to a smaller but more fuel-efficient variant without rendering the vehicle unacceptably slow or weak. This smaller engine is the primary reason cars equipped with IMA get better highway mileage than their more conventional counterparts.

Starting
Additionally, vehicles equipped with IMA can shut off their engine when the vehicle stops and use the electric motor to rapidly spin it back up when the driver releases the brake pedal (or in the manual transmission variant, when the shifter is placed into gear from neutral).  They also have a conventional starter as a backup, making it the only production hybrid system which can operate with its high voltage electric system disabled, using only its engine like a traditional vehicle.  However, since the IMA also acts as the vehicle's alternator, eventually the 12 volt accessory battery would require an external charge.

Other names
ISG: Integrated Starter Generator
ISA: Integrated Starter Alternator
ISAD: Integrated Starter Alternator Damper
CAS: Combined Alternator Starter
CSA: Crankshaft Starter Alternator or Combined Starter Alternator
CISG: Crank-mounted Integrated Starter Generator

List of vehicles using IMA

Honda J-VX (1997 concept car)
Honda Insight (1999-2006, 2010-2014)
Honda Dualnote (2001 concept car)
Honda Fit Hybrid (2010-present)
Honda Fit Shuttle Hybrid (2010-present)
Honda Civic Hybrid (2003-2015)
Honda Accord Hybrid (2005-2007)
Honda Freed Hybrid (2008-present)
Honda CR-Z (2010-2016)
Acura ILX Hybrid (2013-2014)

References

External links
Honda Official "Green Technology - Hybrid"

Automotive technology tradenames
Engine technology
Honda
Hybrid powertrain

de: Honda Civic IMA